Gerry O'Connor (born 1966) is an Irish hurling manager and former player. He was the joint-manager of the Clare senior team with Donal Moloney from 2016 until departing after the 2019 championship.	

On 4 June 2017, in his first Championship game in charge alongside Donal Moloney, Clare defeated Limerick in the Munster Senior Hurling Championship semi-final at Semple Stadium on a 2-16 to 3-17 scoreline.

Honours

Manager

Clare
All-Ireland Under-21 Hurling Championship (3): 2012, 2013, 2014
Munster Under-21 Hurling Championship (3): 2012, 2013, 2014
Munster Minor Hurling Championship (1): 2010

References

1966 births
Living people
Killanena hurlers
Hurling managers